The William Johnson House in Fruitdale, South Dakota, United States, is a bungalow house from c.1909.  It was listed on the National Register of Historic Places in 1986.

The house's bungalow/craftsman architecture, of then current vogue, demonstrates that the tiny town was connected to the national marketplace.  It is a nearly square building, with a deep front porch, and is unusual for having an elevator.  It was built for William Johnson, a banker in Fruitdale.

References

Houses in Butte County, South Dakota
Houses completed in 1909
Houses on the National Register of Historic Places in South Dakota
National Register of Historic Places in Butte County, South Dakota